Joey Russell (born June 24, 1988 in Labrador City) is a Canadian former competitive figure skater. He competed at four ISU Championships; his best result was 11th, achieved at the 2007 World Junior Championships in Oberstdorf and at the 2010 Four Continents Championships in Jeonju. On the national level, he won the Canadian junior title in 2006 and a senior bronze medal in 2011. Russell trained at the Mariposa School of Skating. On May 31, 2011, he announced his retirement from competitive figure skating.

Competitive highlights
GP: Grand Prix; JGP: Junior Grand Prix

References

External links

 

Canadian male single skaters
1988 births
Living people
People from Labrador City
Sportspeople from Newfoundland and Labrador
Figure skating choreographers